James Mitchell (March 16, 1843 – December 15, 1897) was a politician in the Province of New Brunswick, Canada. Prior to entering politics, Mitchell was a schoolteacher and a prominent lawyer in St. Stephen, New Brunswick.

In 1882 he was elected to the provincial legislature as a Liberal MLA. Appointed to the Executive Council, he served as Surveyor-General, Commissioner of Agriculture, Receiver-General and Provincial Secretary.

Mitchell became the eighth premier of New Brunswick in 1896 but resigned in 1897 due to ill health and died shortly thereafter.

Mitchell is buried in the St. Stephen Rural Cemetery in St. Stephen, with his wife Mary Ann (Ryder) and 2-year-old daughter, Christine.

References 

1843 births
1897 deaths
University of New Brunswick alumni
Canadian schoolteachers
Lawyers in New Brunswick
Members of the Executive Council of New Brunswick
Premiers of New Brunswick
People from York County, New Brunswick
People from St. Stephen, New Brunswick